Lomographa percnosticta is a moth in the family Geometridae first described by Katsumi Yazaki in 1994. It is found in Taiwan.

References

Moths described in 1994
Lomographa
Moths of Taiwan